In enzymology, a lysine N-acetyltransferase is an enzyme that catalyzes the chemical reaction

acetyl phosphate + L-lysine  phosphate + N6-acetyl-L-lysine

Thus, the two substrates of this enzyme are acetyl phosphate and L-lysine, whereas its two products are phosphate and N6-acetyl-L-lysine.

This enzyme belongs to the family of transferases, specifically those acyltransferases transferring groups other than aminoacyl groups.  The systematic name of this enzyme class is acetyl-phosphate:L-lysine N6-acetyltransferase. Other names in common use include lysine acetyltransferase, and acetyl-phosphate:L-lysine 6-N-acetyltransferase.  This enzyme participates in lysine degradation.

References

 

EC 2.3.1
Enzymes of unknown structure